Diego Espejo de la Concepción (born 18 August 2002) is a Spanish footballer currently playing as a defender for Atlético Ottawa, on loan from Atlético Madrid B.

Early life
Born in Santa Cruz de Tenerife, Espejo began his youth career with Tenerife. In 2016, he joined the Atlético Madrid youth system. In 2019, he scored a notable bicycle kick goal in a youth match against Leganés.

Club career
In July 2021, he joined Atlético Madrid B in the Tercera División RFEF, where he made a few bench appearances, but did not appear in a match.

In February 2022, he signed a contract extension with Atlético Madrid through, prior to being loaned out to their affiliate club, Atlético Ottawa in the Canadian Premier League for the 2022 season. In 2022, he led the league in headed clearances with 80 and finished second in total clearances with 114. After the season, his loan was extended for another year, with it also being announced that he would trial with Major League Soccer club Inter Miami CF in January, before joining Ottawa for pre-season.

International career
In 2016, he was named to the Canary Islands regional U16 team. In 2018, he was called up to the Spain U17 team, where he earned two caps.

Honours

Atlético Ottawa 
 Canadian Premier League
Regular Season: 2022

Career statistics

Club

Notes

References

External links
Diego Espejo at La Preferente (in Spanish)

2002 births
Living people
Footballers from Santa Cruz de Tenerife
Spanish footballers
Spain youth international footballers
Association football defenders
Canadian Premier League players
CD Tenerife players
Atlético Madrid footballers
Atlético Ottawa players
Spanish expatriate footballers
Spanish expatriate sportspeople in Canada
Expatriate soccer players in Canada